Røstlandet is the administrative centre of Røst Municipality in Nordland county, Norway.  The fishing village covers the southeastern half of the island of Røstlandet.  Røst Airport is located on the northern part of the island.  Røst Church is located in the village and serves the people of Røst Municipality.

Despite its small size, the island attracts many tourists each year.

The village is connected to several smaller islands to the southwest by bridges. There are regular ferry routes connecting the small island of Tjuvøya to the mainland town of Bodø and the nearby island municipalities of Moskenes and Værøy.

Media gallery

References

Villages in Nordland
Røst
Populated places of Arctic Norway